Tetrachne is a monotypic genus of grass in the family Poaceae. The sole species is Tetrachne dregei, known by the common name robies cocksfoot.

References

External links
Grassbase - The World Online Grass Flora

Chloridoideae
Monotypic Poaceae genera